Laguna Army Airfield  is a military airport located at Yuma Proving Ground,  northeast of the central business district of Yuma, a city in Yuma County, Arizona, United States. The airport has an active air traffic control tower within class D airspace.

Laguna Army Airfield was built during World War II as an auxiliary field that served Camp Laguna and the Yuma Army Air Field (now Marine Corps Air Station Yuma). It is one of many Arizona World War II Army Airfields.

Facilities 
Laguna Army Airfield has two asphalt paved runways:
 18/36 measuring 6,118 by 150 feet (1,865 x 46 m)
 6/24 measuring 6,000 by 100 feet (1,829 x 30 m)

See also 

 Marine Corps Air Station Yuma
 Arizona World War II Army Airfields
 List of airports in Arizona

References

Further reading
 Manning, Thomas A. (2005), History of Air Education and Training Command, 1942–2002. Office of History and Research, Headquarters, AETC, Randolph AFB, Texas  
 Shaw, Frederick J. (2004), Locating Air Force Base Sites, History’s Legacy, Air Force History and Museums Program, United States Air Force, Washington DC.

External links 
 Yuma Proving Ground, official site
 
 
 Resources for this U.S. military airport:
 
 
 

United States Army airfields
Airports in Yuma County, Arizona
Military installations in Arizona